Kasur Junction Railway Station 
() is  located in  Pakistan. Before Partition Kasur was Big Junction with Lines to Firozpur & Amritsar. The Amritsar Patti Railway Company Limited was a Private Company incorporated on 12 April 1905. The 27 miles (43 km) broad gauge (BG) from Amritsar to Patti opened in 1906 and worked by North Western Railway(NWR). In 1910 the line was extended to Kasur bringing the line length to 54 miles (86 km) & making Kasur a Big Junction station. The Punjab Mail from BombayMumbai to Peshawar via Bhopal, Jhansi, Agra, Delhi,
Bhatinda, Firozpur, Kasur, Lahore Junction used to run through Kasur Tehsil railway station. The Train is Still running in India from BombayMumbai to Firozpur.

See also
 List of railway stations in Pakistan
 Pakistan Railways

References

External links

Railway stations in Kasur District